Jim Riley is an American musician, who is the drummer for the country band Rascal Flatts. He regularly teaches drums, and has also performed in several awards shows.

Riley attended the University of North Texas, graduating with a degree in music education. He is sponsored by Ludwig, Sabian, Remo, Gibraltar, Latin Percussion, Vater, LP Roland, Shure and Innovative percussion.

Riley was voted "Best Country Drummer" by Modern Drummer magazine in 2017.

Credits 
 The Grammy Awards
 The Tonight Show With Jay Leno
 The Late Show with David Letterman
 Dick Clark’s Rockin’ New Years Eve

References

External links 

American drummers
Year of birth missing (living people)
Living people